Kulunda is a rural locality (a selo) and the administrative center of Kulundinsky District of Altai Krai, Russia. Population:  It is located on the Kazakhstan–Russia border.

Geography
The village is located in the area of the Kulunda Steppe, at the southern edge of the West Siberian Plain.

References

Notes

Sources

Rural localities in Kulundinsky District